Molecular Physics is a peer-reviewed scientific journal covering research on the interface between chemistry and physics, in particular chemical physics and physical chemistry. It covers both theoretical and experimental molecular science, including electronic structure, molecular dynamics, spectroscopy, reaction kinetics, statistical mechanics, condensed matter and surface science. The journal was established in 1958 and is published by Taylor & Francis. According to the Journal Citation Reports, the journal has a 2020 impact factor of 1.962.

The current editor-in-chief is Professor George Jackson (Imperial College London). A reprint of the first editorial and a full list of editors since its establishment can be found in the issue celebrating 50 years of the journal.

Notable current and former editors 

 Christopher Longuet-Higgins (Founding Editor) 
 Joan van der Waals (Founding Editor) 
 John Shipley Rowlinson
 A. David Buckingham
 Lawrence D. Barron
 Martin Quack
 Dominic Tildesley
 Henry F. Schaefer III
 Nicholas C. Handy
 Ruth Lynden-Bell
 Jean-Pierre Hansen
 Timothy Softley
 Martin Head-Gordon
 Trygve Helgaker

See also 
 List of scientific journals in physics
 List of scientific journals in chemistry

References

External links 
 

Publications established in 1958
Physical chemistry journals
Taylor & Francis academic journals
Biweekly journals
English-language journals